Chuhinka is a small village in Shchastia Raion, in the eastern part of the Luhansk Oblast of Ukraine. It is near the border of Ukraine and Russia. Estimated population of the village is 1,720. The area is mostly used for farmland, used by individual families after the breakup of the Kolkhoz. There is a small river and a mountain. 

Nearby villages include Oleksandrivka and Bilovodsk.

References 

Shchastia Raion

Villages in Shchastia Raion